John Turner (1806-1890) was an English architect, noted for his ecclesiastical buildings.

Life
John Turner was born in Holborn, London in 1806. He actively practised as an architect and surveyor in London between 1830 and 1868. before retiring to Rickinghall, Suffolk where he acted as a district surveyor.

A memoir of his life was written by his son, John Goldicutt Turner.

Notable buildings
Holy Trinity, Touchen End, Berkshire 1861-62. Nave with bellcote and chancel. In the Decorated style. The aisle windows all low, segment-headed and of three lights with reticulation units. Wooden posts between nave and south aisle on the pattern of Winkfield.
St Peter, Church Road, Earley, Berkshire 1844. Grey vitrified brick.
All Saints, Dunsden, Oxfordshire 1842

References

External links
Church Plans Online - Plan of Holy Trinity, Touchen End

1806 births
1890 deaths
19th-century English architects
English ecclesiastical architects
People from Holborn
Architects from London
People from Mid Suffolk District